Backsourcing is the process of bringing previously outsourced jobs back under the roof of the company to be performed internally. 

Backsourcing has been increasingly discussed as companies decide to cease outsourcing operations, whether because of the problems with the outsourcing agreements, because of the pressure to bring jobs back to their home country, or simply because it has stopped being efficient to outsource particular tasks. 

Backsourcing is sometimes confused with insourcing. However, insourcing simply refers to conducting certain activities in-house (whether or not by a third party), while backsourcing refers to bringing previously outsourced activities back in-house.

References 

Business terms
Outsourcing